Monteprandone is a comune (municipality) in the Province of Ascoli Piceno in the Italian region Marche, located about  southeast of Ancona and about  northeast of Ascoli Piceno.   It is the birthplace of James of the Marches.
 
Monteprandone borders the following municipalities: Acquaviva Picena, Colonnella, Controguerra, Martinsicuro, Monsampolo del Tronto, San Benedetto del Tronto.

See also
Porto d'Ascoli

References

External links

 Official website

Cities and towns in the Marche